Ronald "Robin" Archer Campbell Byatt  (14 November 1930 – 30 November 2019) was a British diplomat, who served as British High Commissioner to New Zealand, and Zimbabwe and Ambassador to Morocco. He was also the Governor of Pitcairn. He was made a Companion of the Order of St Michael and St George in 1980.

References 

1930 births
2019 deaths
People educated at Gordonstoun
Alumni of New College, Oxford
British diplomats
Companions of the Order of St Michael and St George
High Commissioners of the United Kingdom to New Zealand
High Commissioners of the United Kingdom to Zimbabwe
Governors of Pitcairn